Edmonton International Airport, as of August 29, 2022, officially branded YEG Edmonton International Airport  is the primary air passenger and air cargo facility in the Edmonton Metropolitan Region of the Canadian province of Alberta. The airport offers scheduled non-stop flights to major cities in Canada, the United States, Mexico, the Caribbean, Central America and Europe.

It is a hub facility for Northern Alberta and Northern Canada. The airport has a catchment area encompassing Central and Northern Alberta, northern British Columbia, and Yukon, the Northwest Territories and western Nunavut. Total catchment area is 1.8 million residents. It is Canada's largest major airport by total land area, covering just under , the 5th busiest airport by passenger traffic and 9th busiest by aircraft movements. It served 8,254,121 passengers in 2018.  The airport serves as headquarters for two major Canadian airlines, passenger carrier Flair Airlines and cargo carrier Morningstar Air Express.

History

When the airport opened on November 15, 1960, its first terminal was an arch hangar. Today, it is in use by Summit Air. In 1963, a passenger terminal, built in the international style, was opened. It remains in use as the North Terminal. Artwork, fired by Alberta natural gas, adorned the departures area exterior. A large mural, commissioned by the Canadian government in 1963 for $18,000 titled Bush Pilot in Northern Sky by Jack Shadbolt, remains to this day. An appraisal in 2005 indicated that the mural was worth $750,000, and a restoration of the mural was undertaken in 2007.

During the 1970s, the airport experienced rapid growth in traffic as the city of Edmonton grew, and served approximately 2 million passengers by 1980. However, from the early 1980s until 1995, traffic declined. This decline was attributed to the continued usage of Edmonton City Centre Airport as well as to a slowing economy. Edmonton City Centre did not have the facilities to accept large wide-bodied, long-haul aircraft. Thus airlines used City Centre to fly short-haul flights to hubs in other cities where connections to many locations were available.

Growth returned in 1995. In the 1995 Edmonton municipal election, 77% of voters approved a plebiscite to consolidate all scheduled jet passenger service at Edmonton International Airport.

In 1998, the airport began the $282 million "1998–2005 Redevelopment Project". The three-phase project included the construction of the south terminal and central hall concept, a commuter facility, doubling of the apron, and a multistorey parkade. This redevelopment project expanded the passenger capacity to 5.5 million.

By the time the expansion project was completed in 2005, continued passenger growth triggered planning for another expansion. A new  control and office tower was added in 2009.

Further expansions completed in 2013 including seven new passenger gates, 14 boarding bridges, moving walkways, and advanced baggage handling and scanning systems. A new Renaissance Hotel was another major addition to the airport landscape.

The airport played a major role during the 2016 Fort McMurray wildfire, operating as hubs for aerial firefighting and medical evacuation. The airport became a way-station and temporary shelter for thousands of Fort McMurray evacuees. The Emergency Operations Centre in the airport ran for 112 hours, organizing the arrival and departure of hundreds of aircraft. During May 2016, the airport saw more than 300 additional daily flights on top of their regularly scheduled service.

In August 2016, the Government of Alberta announced $90 million in funding to begin twinning Highway 19 and that it has protected the area needed for a third runway, which is required due its estimated  length and orientation as runway 11/29, causing it to exceed current airport boundaries.

Historical international airline service

The airport had international service soon after it opened. In 1960, Canadian Pacific Airlines was operating nonstop flights to Amsterdam with Bristol Britannia turboprop aircraft several times a week. By 1961, Canadian Pacific had introduced Douglas DC-8 jetliners on its nonstop service to Amsterdam. Also in 1961, US-based Northwest Airlines was operating daily Douglas DC-7C propliner service on a routing of Edmonton–Winnipeg–Minneapolis/St. Paul–Milwaukee–New York City Idlewild Airport (now JFK Airport). In 1962, Trans-Canada Airlines (TCA, now Air Canada) operated direct flights to London's Heathrow Airport once a week via a stop in Winnipeg and also to Paris Orly Airport three times a week via stops in Toronto and Montreal with Douglas DC-8 jets. During the late 1960s and early 1970s, Pacific Western Airlines operated Boeing 707 charter flights from the airport to the UK and other destinations in Europe. In 1970, Air Canada operated nonstop Douglas DC-8 service to London-Heathrow twice a week while CP Air flew nonstop DC-8 service to Amsterdam three times a week. CP Air then introduced Boeing 747 jumbo jet service nonstop to Amsterdam with two flights a week being operated in 1976. By 1978, the airline was also flying nonstop Boeing 747 service to Honolulu. Air Canada had also begun daily nonstop Boeing 727-200 service to both Los Angeles and San Francisco by 1979 and was operating direct one stop McDonnell Douglas DC-9-30 service to Chicago O'Hare Airport via Winnipeg by 1985. Earlier, in 1983, both airlines were operating wide body jetliners on their respective services to Europe with Air Canada flying Lockheed L-1011 TriStar long range series 500 model aircraft three days a week nonstop to London Heathrow while CP Air was flying Boeing 747 jumbo jets three days a week nonstop to Amsterdam. Wardair Canada also operated scheduled and charter flights to Europe as well as charter service to Hawaii from the airport and in 1979 was operating nonstop charter service to London Gatwick Airport and Prestwick in the UK as well as to Amsterdam and Frankfurt. In 1989, Wardair Canada was operating scheduled nonstop service to London Gatwick and Manchester in the UK and was also operating nonstop charter service at this same time to Frankfurt and Honolulu. The Wardair nonstop service to London Gatwick was being operated with Airbus A310 jets with two flights a week in 1989. LOT Polish Airlines flew to Warsaw, Poland until 2001.

Several US-based air carriers besides Northwest served the airport over the years as well. By 1975, Northwest Airlines was operating nonstop Boeing 727-100 jet service to both Anchorage and Minneapolis/St. Paul while Western Airlines was flying Boeing 727-200 and Boeing 737-200 jets direct to Denver, Salt Lake City and Great Falls (with all of these services first stopping in Calgary). Hughes Airwest also served the airport with Douglas DC-9-10 and McDonnell Douglas DC-9-30 jets on nonstop flights to Spokane as well as direct flights to Las Vegas and Los Angeles. By 1980, Hughes Airwest was operating five daily departures from Edmonton with Boeing 727-200 and McDonnell Douglas DC-9-30 jetliners with direct service via Calgary to Los Angeles, San Francisco, Las Vegas, San Diego, Phoenix, Tucson, Burbank, Reno, Boise, Spokane and Palm Springs. In 1981, Western Airlines was operating a daily nonstop Boeing 727-200 flight to Denver with continuing direct service to Phoenix and Los Angeles while Republic Airlines, which had acquired Hughes Airwest, flew daily nonstop Douglas DC-9-10 service to Las Vegas and Spokane. By 1982, Republic Airlines was operating all of its flights to the U.S. from Edmonton via an intermediate stop in Calgary with direct service to Las Vegas, Los Angeles, Phoenix, Spokane and Palm Springs. Also in 1982, Northwest was operating a daily Boeing 727-200 flight on a routing of Edmonton–Minneapolis/St. Paul–Chicago O'Hare Airport–Miami–Fort Lauderdale. United Airlines operated a daily Boeing 727-100 nonstop flight to San Francisco with direct one-stop service to Los Angeles in 1983. Western Airlines operated a Boeing 727-200 nonstop to Salt Lake City in 1987 with this daily flight providing direct one stop service to Los Angeles. Delta Air Lines then acquired and merged with Western with Delta continuing to operate nonstop service to Salt Lake City from the late 1980s to the mid-1990s, first with a Boeing 727-200 and later with a Boeing 757-200 with these flights providing direct one stop service to Los Angeles as well.

In 1999, Canadian Airlines International flew daily nonstop Boeing 737-200 service to Chicago O'Hare Airport while Air BC flew nonstop British Aerospace BAe 146-200 jet service to Denver on behalf of Air Canada on a code sharing basis as an Air Canada Connector air carrier. Also in 1999, Horizon Air began nonstop Fokker F28 Fellowship jet service to Seattle flying on behalf of Alaska Airlines on a code sharing basis. Martinair Holland also operated flights between Edmonton International Airport and Amsterdam Schiphol Airport prior to the termination of this airline's passenger service. In 2005, America West Express operated by Mesa Airlines via a code sharing agreement on behalf of America West Airlines was flying nonstop to Los Angeles with Bombardier CRJ900 aircraft.

Terminal
Edmonton International Airport offers United States border preclearance facilities. Passengers from domestic flights connecting in Edmonton to a US destination use Quick Connect, which enables passengers to clear US Customs and Border Protection without having to claim and recheck baggage or re-clear security during the connection. The airport has an Air Canada Maple Leaf Lounge and two Plaza Premium lounges.

The 213-room in-airport Renaissance Edmonton Airport Hotel is located groundside within the terminal complex.

Airlines and destinations

Passenger
Edmonton International Airport provides scheduled non-stop flights to 55 destinations. It serves as the hub for Flair Airlines. Edmonton is also the western hub for Swoop, becoming the largest hub for Swoop in the winter, flying 51 departures weekly during the season. Edmonton is one of WestJet's largest focus cities; the airline flies to 30 destinations with an average of 62 daily departures, nonstop, from Edmonton. WestJet (and its subsidiaries) are the largest carriers at Edmonton International Airport, holding more than 70% of the market share.

Cargo

Air ambulance services
The airport is home to a purpose-built facility on its southern edge that is shared by Alberta Health Services fixed-wing air ambulance operations, as well as one of three bases in the province for STARS helicopter air ambulance. Nor-Alta Aviation also provides Air Ambulance services at Edmonton Airport under contract from Alberta Health Services. Nor-Alta Aviation purchased Can-West Corporate Air Charters Ltd. and became Can-West Corporate Air Charters a Nor-Alta Aviation Company in late 2015.

Other

Regional air traffic control
The Edmonton Area Control Centre  operated by Nav Canada is located at the airport. It is responsible for all aircraft movements over a flight information region (FIR) consisting of Alberta and most of northern Canada, including the high Arctic.

Airline operational facilities
Edmonton-based Flair Airlines maintains its headquarters and operational offices at Edmonton International Airport. Ontario-based Canadian North maintains its operations facilities at EIA.

Private and corporate aviation
Private aviation companies Aurora Jet Partners and Airco Aircraft Charters  are headquartered at the airport.

Alberta Aviation Council
The Alberta Aviation Council, a non-profit group that represents the aviation and aerospace industries in Alberta, is headquartered at the airport.

Other facilities
The Premium Outlet Collection EIA outlet mall is located at the airport. Construction officially began in spring 2016 on the  shopping mall and opened on May 2, 2018. The mall features over 100 outlet stores, with many of them making their Canadian debut. Adjacent to the mall is a business park and hotels.

The RedTail Landing Golf Club and the Century Mile Racetrack and Casino are located on the northeast corner of the airport grounds, while the RAD Torque Raceway is located on the northwest corner.

In 2016, Aurora Sky began building the world's largest and most advanced marijuana production facility. In August 2022, the facility was sold and will be used for greenhouse vegetables and other horticulture by Bevo Farms.

Petition to rename 
The idea to rename Edmonton International Airport as Edmonton Max Ward International Airport, in honour of Edmonton native Maxwell W. Ward, was first conceived by aviation enthusiast Bill Powell, following Ward's death in November 2020. Powell was 13 years old the first time he wrote to Max Ward, former bush pilot and founder of Canadian airline Wardair, after his first Wardair flight, and is leading the push to rename the airport in honour of the aviation legend.

On November 6, 2020, a Change.org petition was launched by Western Aviation News to rename Edmonton International Airport as Edmonton Max Ward International Airport. And an official Canadian House of Commons petition was also launched by Powell on February 2, 2021, and sponsored by Mike Lake, Member of Parliament for Edmonton—Wetaskiwin.

On the morning of August 29, 2022, Edmonton International Airport officially transitioned from EIA to YEG using the YEG acronym from the IATA identifier of the airport as part of the official name.

Statistics

Top destinations
{| class="wikitable" width=align=
|+ Busiest international routes from YEG (2017)'! Rank
! Airport
! Passengers
! Carriers
|-
| 1
| Las Vegas, Nevada
| 151,524
| WestJet
|-
| 2
| Seattle, Washington
| 150,230
| Alaska, Delta
|-
| 3
| Phoenix–Sky Harbor, Arizona
| 111,097
| American, WestJet
|-
| 4
| Minneapolis/St. Paul, Minnesota
|  99,944
| Delta
|-
| 5
| Amsterdam, Netherlands
| 91,292 
| KLM
|-
| 6
| Denver, Colorado
| 88,025
| United
|-
| 7
| Houston–Intercontinental, Texas
| 86,244 
| United
|-
| 8
| Los Angeles, California
| 84,402
| WestJet
|-
| 9
| Cancun, Mexico
| 47,438
| WestJet, Sunwing Airlines, Air Transat
|-
| 10
| Palm Springs, California
| 45,238
| WestJet
|}

Annual traffic

Ground transportation
Bus
Edmonton Transit System (ETS) provides express service between the Edmonton International Airport and the Century Park LRT Station, facilitating connections to the region's wider transit system. Route 747 runs between 4:10 a.m. and midnight every 30 minutes most times of the day.

Leduc Transit's Route 10 provides service between the airport and the city of Leduc.

Sundog Tours provides coach service from Jasper National Park via Edmonton, Edson, and Hinton.

Ebus offers daily and direct coach service from Red Deer and Calgary.

Car
The airport is accessible from Alberta Highway 2 south of Edmonton.

Appearances in media
The airport was the subject of the 2016 History reality series Airport: Below Zero''.

Accidents and incidents
On January 2, 1973, a Boeing 707-321C CF-PWZ of Pacific Western Airlines, on a cargo flight carrying 86 cattle from Toronto, Ontario with five crew-members on board, was on approach to runway 30. Visibility was poor with blowing snow, and turbulence, causing the aircraft to strike the ground  short of runway 30. Hitting trees, power-lines and a gravel ridge, the aircraft erupted into fire. All five of the crew-members were killed in the crash along with the cattle, and the aircraft was damaged beyond economic repair. No investigation was conducted, and thus the cause of the crash remains unidentified.
On November 6, 2014, Air Canada Express Flight JZA8481, a Bombardier DHC-8-402 (registration C-GGBF), on a passenger flight from Calgary to Grande Prairie with 71 passengers and three crew-members, experienced a landing gear tire rupture during takeoff.  During take off, the third tire of the main landing gear burst. This caused a loud banging noise that was heard inside the plane. Head winds prevented landing back in Calgary, so it was diverted to Edmonton International Airport. During landing, the right main landing gear collapsed, causing the plane's right side propellers to strike the ground and break. One of the blades were ejected through the cabin wall and injured three passengers.

References

External links

 Edmonton Airport homepage
 Fly Edmonton Campaign
 Canadian Owners and Pilots Association Places to Fly Airport Directory page about Edmonton International Airport
 

Certified airports in Alberta
Airports established in 1960
Buildings and structures in Edmonton
Edmonton Airports
Edmonton Metropolitan Region
Canadian airports with United States border preclearance
Leduc County
National Airports System
1960 establishments in Alberta